The Saint-Jérôme Alouettes were a junior ice hockey team that played in Saint-Jérôme, Quebec, Canada. The team originated during the late 1950s in the Quebec Junior Hockey League, and played there until 1969. After which, the Alouettes joined the higher calibre Quebec Major Junior Hockey League, and played for three seasons, from 1969 to 1972.

NHL alumni
Nine alumni of the Saint-Jérôme Alouettes graduated to play in the National Hockey League.

Other alumni

Federal Court of Appeals judge Marc Nadon was drafted by the team in the 1960s.

Yearly results

References 

1969 establishments in Quebec
1972 disestablishments in Quebec
Defunct Quebec Major Junior Hockey League teams
Ice hockey clubs established in 1969
Ice hockey clubs disestablished in 1972
Saint-Jérôme